Ferdinand Eloy Adams (3 May 1903 – 1992) was a Belgian international footballer who played as a striker for Anderlecht. Adams scored 9 goals in 23 appearances for the Belgian national side, and he played at the 1930 FIFA World Cup.

External links
 Anderlecht profile 
 

1903 births
1992 deaths
Belgian footballers
Belgium international footballers
R.S.C. Anderlecht players
1930 FIFA World Cup players
People from Berchem
Association football forwards
Footballers from Antwerp